Kola is an unincorporated community in southwestern Manitoba, Canada.

The community is accessible by vehicle via PR 257 and PR 542.

See also
Pipestone Creek (Saskatchewan)

References 

Unincorporated communities in Westman Region